Got to Be Tough may refer to:
 Got to Be Tough (MC Shy D album), 1987
 Got to Be Tough (Toots and the Maytals album), 2020